Chelsea Jane Winstanley  (born 30 January 1976) is a New Zealand film producer. She produces short films and documentaries which celebrate Indigenous peoples. She also produced the films What We Do in the Shadows and Jojo Rabbit.

Career
Chelsea Jane Winstanley was born on 30 January 1976, in Tauranga, Bay of Plenty, New Zealand. She is the daughter of John Winstanley, a home renovator, and Cherry Wilson, a psychotherapist. Chelsea Winstanley's paternal grandfather was John James Winstanley (1905–1977), an ice cream vendor, born in Wigan, Lancashire, England. Winstanley's paternal grandmother Sophia Millerstone Rowe (nee MacDonald) (1914–1961) was the daughter of James MacDonald and Caroline Creed of Inverness, Scotland. Winstanley's maternal grandmother was Kiritapu "Kitty" Wilson (nee Borell) (1926–2014). Winstanley has Ngāti Ranginui and Ngāi Te Rangi ancestry through her mother. 

She has produced short films such as Meathead, Ebony Society and Night Shift. In 2014, she co-produced What We Do in the Shadows with Taika Waititi and Jemaine Clement. She also co-produced Te Whakarauora Tangata and a documentary about Merata Mita.

In 2017, Winstanley created the film production company Matewa Media alongside Tweedie Waititi, which focuses on creating Māori language adaptations of Disney animated films. As of 2020, the company has created adaptations of Moana (released in 2017), The Lion King and Frozen (both released in 2022). She directed the documentary Toi Tū Toi Ora in 2020.

Awards and recognition 
She won the 2014 SPADA Screen Industry Awards Independent Producer of the Year (shared with Taika Waititi). In 2015, Winstanley was the New Zealand Women in Film and Television's Mana Wahine recipient at Wairoa's Maori Film Festival.

In the 2022 Queen's Birthday and Platinum Jubilee Honours, Winstanley was appointed an Officer of the New Zealand Order of Merit, for services to the screen industry and Māori.

Winstanley has won two awards at the Women in Film and Television New Zealand Awards: in 2009 she won the Woman to Watch Award, and in 2022 she won the Award for Achievement in Film.

Personal life
At age 20, Winstanley had a son, Maia, whom she raised as a single mother.

She married New Zealand director Taika Waititi in 2011; they have two daughters. The couple separated in 2018.

References

External links
 

1970s births
Living people
New Zealand film producers
Ngāti Ranginui people
Ngāi Te Rangi people
Year of birth missing (living people)
Place of birth missing (living people)
New Zealand Māori film producers
New Zealand women film producers
New Zealand Māori women
Waititi family
Officers of the New Zealand Order of Merit
People from Tauranga